The Japan Association of Conference Interpreters (JACI) is a professional association of conference interpreters in Japan, with approximately 500 members as of September 2021. The association was founded in 2015.

Membership is open to any individual who interprets between Japanese and one or more foreign languages as a profession, scholars of translation and/or interpreting research, and others interested in interpreting in general. Members include, but are not limited to, translators, interpreters, teachers, agency representatives, and project managers.

The association's home office is in Tokyo, Japan.

Directors and Auditors
 Michael Sekine (President)
 Jun-ichi Shirakura (Vice President)
 Fri McWilliams (Vice President)
 Miho Tatsumi (Director)
 Yoko Ono (Director)
 Kana Hashimoto (Director)
 Masaharu Kanda (Director)
 Yuki Matsuoka (Director)
 Maki Jagawa (Director)
 Yusuke Sasaki (Director)
 Yuki Watanabe (Director)
 Naoki Sato (Auditor)
 Seiichiro Nakamura (Auditor)

See also
 List of Japanese interpreting and translation associations
 Japan Interpreting Forum

External links
 Japan Association of Conference Interpreters

Professional associations based in Japan